The State Minister's Office on Diaspora Issues of Georgia was a governmental agency within the Cabinet of Georgia in charge of establishing and maintaining contacts with the Georgian diaspora abroad. The ministry was established in 2008. In November 2016, the Office was dissolved and merged with the Ministry of Foreign Affairs.

Ministers
Iulon Gagoshidze, 2008–2009
Mirza Davitaia, 2009–2012
Kote Surguladze, 2012–2014
Gela Dumbadze, 2014–2016

See also
Cabinet of Georgia

References

2008 establishments in Georgia (country)
Georgia
Diaspora Issues Of Georgia
Georgia
2016 disestablishments in Georgia (country)
Georgian diaspora